Sham dustbathing is a behaviour performed by some birds when kept in cages with little or no access to litter, during which the birds perform all the elements of normal dustbathing, but in the complete absence of any substrate.  This behaviour often has all the activities and temporal patterns of normal dustbathing, i.e. the bird initially scratches and bill-rakes at the ground, then erects its feathers and squats.  Once lying down, the behaviour contains four main elements: vertical wing-shaking, head rubbing, bill-raking and scratching with one leg.  Normal dustbathing is a maintenance behaviour whose performance results in dust collecting between the feathers. The dust is then subsequently shaken off which reduces the amount of feather lipids and so helps the plumage maintain good insulating capacity and may help control of ectoparasites.

Terminology
Sham dustbathing is sometimes referred to as "vacuum dustbathing".  In the Konrad Lorenz model of behaviour regulation, vacuum activities occur when motivation for a certain behaviour builds to a sufficiently high level that the behaviour is performed in the complete absence of relevant stimuli. However, hens "dustbathing" on wire floors commonly perform this close to the feed trough where they can peck and bill-rake in the food. Because it seems the birds appear to treat the feed as a dustbathing substrate, the term "sham dustbathing" is more appropriate.

Motivational basis

Sham dustbathing, like normal dustbathing, appears to have both internal and external causal factors.

Internal causal factors
Under unrestricted conditions, adult birds dustbathe about every second day, with a diurnal rhythm peaking in the middle of the day, and an average dustbathing bout lasting about 27 minutes.  Hens without litter (i.e. an absence of external causal factors) will perform sham dustbathing with a similar temporal pattern.  Some hens deprived of litter until they had developed sham dustbathing and then given access to litter, showed sham dustbathing although litter was available. Thus, there is some support for an effect of habit or early experience on sham dustbathing. 

Depriving hens of the opportunity to dustbathe results in a rebound when hens are again allowed access to dust.  Birds work for access to litter, in which case they sometimes, although not always, dustbathe. There are indications of stress when hens are deprived of the possibility to dustbathe, and if this deprivation is sufficiently long, sham dustbathing behaviour develops.

External causal factors
It has been suggested that the sight of other hens performing the behaviour increases the probability of sham dustbathing, i.e. social facilitation; however, when tested, the sight of stimulus birds had no effect on the sham dustbathing behaviour of test birds.  As indicated above, hens "dustbathing" on wire floors commonly perform this close to the feed trough where they can peck and bill-rake in the food, indicating this may be an external causal factor.

Welfare
Sham dustbathing raises an interesting question in animal behaviour, motivation and welfare. Hens that have been reared in captivity without ever having encountered litter will perform sham dustbathing. Therefore, it can be questioned how these birds, which have never had the possibility to dustbathe in a functional substrate, perceive sham dustbathing; do they yearn for something that they have never had or known (i.e. litter), or are they content to sham dustbathe? A weighted push-door was used as the operant method to quantify motivation to dustbathe in adult hens with different previous experiences of litter. There was no difference between hens in the weight of doors they pushed open to gain access to peat. Hens that had no previous experience of peat were as motivated to work to gain access to this substrate as birds used to dustbathing in peat. This implies that sham dustbathing is not satisfying to the hen nor is it perceived as normal dustbathing.

See also
Ethogram

References

Animal welfare
Bird behavior
Ornithology
Abnormal behaviour in animals